Anastasiia Makina (born 10 December 1997) is a Russian handballer for Dinamo Volgograd and the Russia national team.

References

1997 births
Living people
Sportspeople from Volgograd
Russian female handball players